The Sun Fire X4500 data server (code named Thumper) integrates server and storage technologies. It was announced in July, 2006 and is part of the Sun Fire server line from Sun Microsystems.

In July 2008, Sun announced the X4540 model (code-named Thor), which doubles the processing power of the X4500.

In November 2010, Oracle designated that the X4540 is end-of-life and has no next-generation replacement model.

Development
Thumper was developed by Palo Alto, California based company Kealia inc. Kealia was founded in 2001 by Stanford University professor David Cheriton and Sun co-founder Andy Bechtolsheim. When Sun bought Kealia in 2004, Thumper became the basis for the X4500 model.

Hardware 
The Sun Fire X4500 supports two dual-core AMD Opteron processors and up to 64 GB RAM. With forty-eight 500/1000/2000 GB SATA drives, it provides up to 96 TB of raw storage in four rack units.

The Sun Fire X4540 supports two quad- or six-core AMD K10 (Barcelona) processors and up to 128 GB RAM. The new model also uses PCI Express IO technology, and added a compact flash disk slot for booting the operating system.

A significant feature of both systems is that the I/O framework was designed to handle high throughput on all disks simultaneously. These were the first systems designed specifically with ZFS in mind, so no hardware RAID is included.

Supported operating systems 
 Solaris 10
 Red Hat Enterprise Linux 4.0
 SUSE Linux Enterprise Server 10
 Rocks Cluster Distribution
 Microsoft Windows Server 2003 (Standard and Enterprise)
 Microsoft Windows Server 2008
FreeNAS 9.3 - newer do not work

Products using X4500/X4540 
 Sun Streaming System
 Sun Visualization System
 Sun Secure Data Retrieval Server (SDRS)
 Sun Constellation System
 Sun StorageTek Virtual Tape Library Value ("VTL Value") System
 Sun Scalable Storage Cluster
 Luminex Virtual Tape Solution for IBM zSeries mainframes via FICON
 SAS Intelligence Storage
 Greenplum's Sun Data Warehouse Appliance
 IPConfigure - Enterprise Surveillance Manager
 G10 Enterprise Video Manager
 Media Server for Symantec Veritas NetBackup
 Cypress Storage Appliance
 Internet Archive

Forty-two Sun Fire X4500 data servers are used to provide Lustre cluster filesystem storage in the TSUBAME supercomputer, which was number 7 in June 2006 TOP500 list.

TPC-H World Record 
In October 2007, Sun submitted TPC-H result with an X4500 running Sybase IQ. At US $8.11/QphH, it achieved the best price/performance among the 1,000 GB results.

References

External links
 Sun Fire X4500 Server
 Sun Fire X4540 Server
 Sun Fire X4640 Server
 Sun Fire X4500 System Walkthrough and Part 2 (YouTube Video)
 Sun Fire x4500 demonstration - Andy Bechtolsheim demonstrating the 4500 hardware, Menlo Park Ca, 11 July 2006
 Configuring the Sun Fire X4500 Server as Network Attached Archival Storage for Symantec Enterprise Vault

Sun servers